Zhunan Township  is an urban township in northern Miaoli County, Taiwan. Its city centre forms a continuous urban area with Toufen.

Name
Literally, Zhúnán means "bamboo south" but in this context, zhú is short for "Hsinchu".  Thus, Zhunan lies south of Hsinchu (cf. Zhubei which lies north [běi] of Hsinchu).  A previous name of the area was Tiong-káng, literally "central port", a name preserved in Zhonggang, one of the 25 constituent villages of Zhunan.  The present name was adopted under Japanese rule in 1920.

Geography
 Area: 
 Population: 88,465 (January 2023 estimate)

Administrative divisions
The township comprises 25 villages: Dacuo, Dapu, Dingpu, Gangqi, Gongguan, Gongyi, Haikou, Jiaxing, Kaiyuan, Longfeng, Longshan, Qiding, Shanjia, Shengfu, Tianwen, Xinnan, Yingpan, Zhaonan, Zhengnan, Zhonggang, Zhonghua, Zhongmei, Zhongying, Zhunan and Zhuxing.

Politics
The township is part of Miaoli County Constituency I electoral district for Legislative Yuan.

Institutions
 National Health Research Institutes

Sights and facilities

Zhunan was traditionally a beach and fishing community, and is closely associated with Goddess Mazu, who is the Goddess of Sea and Patron Deity of fishermen, sailors and any occupations related to sea/ocean. Zhunan's main tourist attraction is its prominent Mazu Temples like Zhonggang Cihyu Temple and Hotsu Longfong Temple which has a statue of the Goddess that is over 100 feet tall.

Zhunan is now part of Taiwan's computer sector and has a large Science Park.

Zhunan has wide open beaches and some cycling routes that run parallel to the beaches. Beach access was difficult until a bridge connecting the harbour and the beaches opened in 2008. It is a favourite spot among locals for surfing, kiteboarding, and windsurfing due to the year-round winds. Mountains overlook the town and are within a 20-minute drive.

 Longfeng Fishing Port
 Qiding Tunnels
 Zhonggang Cihyu Temple
 Hotsu Longfong Temple
 Northern Miaoli Art Center
 Ten Ren Tea Culture Museum
 Zhunan Brewery

Infrastructures
 Miaoli County Refuse Incineration Plant

Transportation

Zhunan is served by National Freeway 3 and Provincial Highway 61. The township is accessible from Zhunan Station and Qiding Station of Taiwan Railways.

Notable natives
 Kang Shih-ju, member of Legislative Yuan (2009–2012)
 Tsai Wan-lin, former businessman
 Tsai Wan-tsai, former banker

References

External links

  

Townships in Miaoli County